Peter Gwynne (1929 – 17 November 2011) was a New Zealand-born Australian television actor who was also known for voice-over work.

Career 
Born in New Zealand, Gwynne was a well-recognised character actor, appearing in many of the significant television productions of the 1970s onwards, including Cop Shop, Boney, Division 4, Homicide, Matlock Police, Flying Doctors, Return to Eden, A Country Practice and many more.

He is best remembered internationally as Bill McMaster, Stephanie Harper's General Manager at Harper Mining in both the 1983 mini-series and the 1986 series of Return to Eden.

Personal life 
Peter Gwynne was married to actress Cecily Polson. Peter's Mother (Dorothy Wall) was born in Springwood, New South Wales and moved to NZ after she married Dr. Frank Gwynne from Christchurch. Peter last resided at Lane Cove in Sydney, New South Wales. He died on 17 November 2011, aged 82.

Selected filmography
Seven Little Australians (1973)
Matlock Police (regular cast member: 1975–6)
Dot and the Kangaroo (1977) 
Against the Wind (1978)
Tim (1979) (with Mel Gibson)
Peach’s Gold – Land of Gold (1983)
Grave of the President (1984)
Mother and Son (Episode: The Funeral) (1984)
Bodyline (1984)
Track Record: The Story of Australia’s Railways - Tethered to the World (1991)
Old Scores (1991)
G.P. (Episode: A Very Suburban Coup) (1992)
The Nostradamus Kid (1993) 
Over the Hill (1994-1995)
The Magic Pudding (2000) Benjamin Brandysnap
Australia (2008) (with Nicole Kidman and Hugh Jackman)

References

External links

Australian male television actors
New Zealand male television actors
People from Auckland
New Zealand expatriates in Australia
1929 births
2011 deaths
20th-century Australian male actors
20th-century New Zealand male actors
21st-century Australian male actors
21st-century New Zealand male actors